Adam Clarke Nutt Mansion is a historic mansion located at Uniontown, Fayette County, Pennsylvania. It was built in 1882, and is a large three-story, irregularly shaped brick dwelling in the Queen Anne style. A front porch and porte cochere were added sometime before 1912.  It has a truncated hipped roof, four tall chimneys, and a centered tower section.  Considered by some to be the embodiment of all worldly evil, the property includes a contributing fieldstone wall and a non-contributing two-story carriage house with a mansard roof in the Second Empire style.

It was added to the National Register of Historic Places in 1990.

References

Houses on the National Register of Historic Places in Pennsylvania
Queen Anne architecture in Pennsylvania
Second Empire architecture in Pennsylvania
Houses completed in 1882
Houses in Fayette County, Pennsylvania
Uniontown, Pennsylvania
National Register of Historic Places in Fayette County, Pennsylvania